An Evening with Il Divo: Live in Barcelona is the first live album by classical crossover vocal group Il Divo. It was recorded at the Palau Sant Jordi concert An Evening with Il Divo: Live in Barcelona. on 3 April 2009 and the album was released 1 December the same year. It was made available in both Blu-ray and DVDs + CD format.

Overview 

The live album mostly covers material from their prior studio albums but also includes two new songs in the quartet's repertoire. "Bridge over Troubled Water", by Simon & Garfunkel, and "The Impossible Dream" from the Broadway musical Man of La Mancha. It contains songs interpreted mainly in English and Spanish, and the DVD includes behind the scenes and an interview with the group. It was directed by Guillermo Baker.  Giorgio Armani designed the wardrobe of Carlos Marín, David Miller, Sebastien Izambard and Urs Buhler for this concert.

It debuted at No.1 in nine countries, including Spain, Portugal and the Netherlands and was certified Gold in Mexico.

Track listing

DVD

CD

Certifications

See also 
 Il Divo Videography
 Il Divo discography

References 

2009 live albums
Il Divo albums